Alesso (born Alessandro Lindblad, 1991) is a Swedish DJ and electronic dance music producer.

Alesso may also refer to:

Alesso di Benozzo (1473–1528), Italian painter
Alesso Baldovinetti (1425–1499), Italian early Renaissance painter